Alma Lucile Land Lacy (August 18, 1901 – October 29, 1994) was an American painter and printmaker.

Biography 
A native of Temple, Texas, Lacy was a pupil of Ellen Douglas Stuart and Ella Koepke Mewhinney. She graduated from Baylor Female College with a Bachelor of Arts degree, and attended the New York School of Interior Decoration before receiving a Master of Arts degree from Columbia University in 1940. She began her teaching career as an assistant in her alma mater's art department in 1933; from 1924 until 1931 she was an instructor, and from 1932 until 1944 she headed the department. Upon retirement from the college she studied at the University of Pennsylvania, which led to her licensing as an occupational therapist in 1945. In that year she began work as a therapist at the Old Farms Convalescent Hospital in Avon, Connecticut, continuing for two years. In 1947 she took a position as  chief occupational therapist at the Veterans Administration hospital in Temple, and two years later she moved to Houston to occupy the same role, remaining there until 1953. She was active in state and national associations for her profession. Lacy later returned to Temple, where she died. She is buried in that city's Hillcrest Cemetery.

Artwork 
Lacy was a member of numerous artistic organizations during her career, including the Southern States Art League and the Texas Fine Arts Association. In 1939 she was one of eight women who founded the Printmakers Guild, later called Texas Printmakers, to challenge the male-dominated Lone Star Printmakers; the others were Bertha Landers, Stella LaMond, Mary Lightfoot, Verda Ligon, Blanche McVeigh, Coreen May Spellman, and Lura Ann Taylor. From 1942 until 1944 she was president of the Texas Art Education Association. She exhibited her work widely, both in Texas and elsewhere in the United States, and in 1943 was the subject of a one-woman show of prints at the Dallas Museum of Art. A scholarship in her honor at her alma mater, today the University of Mary Hardin-Baylor, was established by former pupil Marjorie Hamilton Gillies. Three of Lacy's prints, the linocut First Monday of c. 1935–1940 and the lithographs Left Side of Tracks, of 1940, and the undated Summer Blankness, are in the collection of the National Gallery of Art; they are part of the donation made to the museum by Reba and Dave Williams of the Print Research Foundation in 2009.

References

1901 births
1994 deaths
American women painters
American women printmakers
20th-century American painters
20th-century American printmakers
20th-century American women artists
Occupational therapists
People from Temple, Texas
Painters from Texas
University of Mary Hardin–Baylor alumni
Columbia University alumni
University of Pennsylvania alumni
University of Mary Hardin–Baylor faculty
American women academics